Marcellin Mve Ebang (born 13 April 1959) is a Gabonese politician. He is a member of the Gabonese Democratic Party (Parti démocratique gabonais) (PDG), a diplomat and a deputy of the National Assembly of Gabon in Libreville. He studied at Paris 1 Pantheon-Sorbonne University in International Law.

References

Members of the National Assembly of Gabon
Gabonese Democratic Party politicians
Living people
1959 births
Gabonese diplomats
21st-century Gabonese people